College Magazine is a college-guide and quarterly magazine, written and edited by college students, created in 2007 by publisher and founder Amanda Nachman. Both site and magazine feature articles on academic advice, career tips, student success stories, NCAA sports features, sex questions and celebrity interviews. Past issues have featured musicians, athletes and celebrities including Mike Posner, Kate Voegele, Sara Bareilles, Nastia Liukin, Kim Kardashian, Glenn Howerton and Chelsea Handler.

As of 2011, the print publication reaches 200,000 students at 14 universities in Washington D.C., Maryland, Philadelphia and Florida.

History
Nachman developed College Magazine during her senior year of college for an entrepreneurship class at the University of Maryland and launched the first issue in September 2007. The first issue was distributed solely in College Park.  The next year, the company landed $150K of seed funding.  By early 2009, 45 students and a lecturer were writing regularly for the magazine.

College Magazine articles are written by students and the cover-features focus on students with success stories. Nachman said of the publication, "I wanted this to be more than just a how-to guide ... This is a chance for other students to be inspired by their peers' experiences."

In April 2009, College Magazine business plan won first prize in the University of Maryland's "Cupid's Cup" Business Competition sponsored by Kevin Plank.

Contributors
Magazine editors and staff writers are students from universities nationwide.  Most find out about the magazine through journalism listservs or online and apply online at collegemagazine.com with a writing sample and details of where they've been published before. Editors must have previous experience writing and editing for a college level publication as well as leadership experiences. College Magazine has five section editors to oversee the main website sections: Success, Social Life, Sex & Dating, College Sports and Entertainment.

Features
The site and the print magazine provide student written articles on the topics of sex, academic and career success, social life, celebrities and entertainment. Articles include interviews with experts in their fields, professors, students and celebrities.

The website also includes an internship database with listings of opportunities for students at companies nationwide, and weekly blogs This Week in Entertainment and The Four Year Blog.

References 

2007 establishments in Maryland
Student magazines published in the United States
Magazines established in 2007
Magazines published in Maryland